In 2018, protests against gun violence in the United States increased after a series of mass shootings, most notably at the Marjory Stoneman Douglas High School on February 14 that year. An organized protest in the form of a national school walkout occurred on March 14. March for Our Lives was held on March 24. Another major demonstration occurred April 20, 2018.

Demonstrations

Rally in Fort Lauderdale, Florida 
The anti-gun violence group Never Again MSD, formed and led by survivors of the Stoneman Douglas High School shooting, held a rally on February 17 in Fort Lauderdale, Florida, which was attended by hundreds of students.

The Fort Lauderdale rally was followed by other protests across the country. On February 19, a group of teenagers staged a "lie-in" outside the White House. Hundreds of students marched to Marjory Stoneman Douglas High School on February 20. Students also demonstrated at Florida's Capitol. In Kansas, several hundred high school students protested on February 21.

March 1 NRA-sponsor boycotts 

The students from Parkland, Florida began encouraging companies who partner with the NRA — offering perks or discounts to members — to sever ties with the organization. Over a dozen companies dropped their NRA partnership in the days following.

Enough! National School Walkout

The Enough! National School Walkout was a walkout planned by organizers of the Students' March, that occurred on March 14, in response to the Stoneman Douglas High School shooting. The protest had students, parents, and gun control students leaving schools for seventeen minutes (one minute for each person who died during the shooting) starting at 10:00 a.m. in their respective time zone. The protest was held exactly one month after the Stoneman Douglas shooting. The American Civil Liberties Union (ACLU) supported the student's activism.

An estimated 3,000 schools and nearly 1 million students participated in the protest. Thousands of students gathered in Washington, D.C. and observed 17 minutes of silence with their backs turned to the White House.

At Greenbrier High School in Greenbrier, Arkansas three students elected to receive corporal punishment in the form of two paddlings on the thighs for their participation in the walkout. This required parental consent, and was administered the same day.

Nearly 200 U.S. colleges added their names to #NeverAgain Colleges, including the Massachusetts Institute of Technology (MIT), Harvard University, Yale University, Columbia University, and the University of Florida. The colleges would not penalize high school students who face disciplinary action as a result of participating in a peaceful Never Again MSD protest.

U.S. broadcaster Viacom expressed support for the protests, including executive Shari Redstone making a $500,000 donation to March For Our Lives, and all Viacom U.S. cable networks (including MTV and Nickelodeon) suspending programming for seventeen minutes at a time at 10:00 a.m. in each time zone, in solidarity for the walkouts. The company also planned discussion and acknowledgement of the movement in programming and other output by its channels.

March for Our Lives 

March for Our Lives was a student-led demonstration in support of tighter gun control that took place on March 24, 2018, in Washington, D.C., with over 800 sibling events throughout the United States and around the world. Student organizers from Never Again MSD planned the march in collaboration with the nonprofit organization Everytown for Gun Safety. The event followed the Stoneman Douglas High School shooting, which was described by many media outlets as a possible tipping point for gun control legislation.

Protesters urged for universal background checks on all gun sales, raising the federal age of gun ownership and possession to the age of 21, closing of the gun show loophole, a restoration of the 1994 Federal Assault Weapons Ban, and a ban on the sale of high-capacity magazines in the United States. Turnout was estimated to be between 1.2 and 2 million people in the United States, making it one of the largest protests in American history.

Northwestern Senior High School 
On Tuesday, April 10, 2018, hundreds of students walked out of their Miami high school to protest gun violence after four current or former classmates were shot off campus. The students chanted "no justice, no peace" Tuesday and carried "enough is enough" signs outside Northwestern Senior High School. They staged the protest after the weekend shooting deaths of 17-year-old Kimson Green, a 10th-grader who was about to become a member of the National Honor Society, and 18-year-old Rickey Dixon, a former Northwestern student. Two other current or former classmates were wounded. The shooting happened Sunday at an apartment complex in the Liberty City neighborhood, which is plagued by gun violence.

April 20 The National School Walkout 

The National School Walkout occurred nationally on April 20, 2018 which was the 19th anniversary of the Columbine High School massacre. The movement was founded and organized by Lane Murdock of Ridgefield High School. On the day of the walkout, student demonstrators wore safety orange and departed from over 2600 schools to push for legislative action against gun violence.

See also 

 Gun culture in the United States
 Gun politics in the United States
 List of protests in the 21st century

References

External links
 

 
Gun violence protests
2018 protests
2018 gun violence protests
2018 gun violence protests
Stoneman Douglas High School shooting